Santísima Trinidad (meaning "Holy Trinity") was a bay on the northeast coast of Taiwan at Keelung, where in 1626 the Spanish established a settlement and built . They occupied the site until 1642 when they were driven out by the Dutch. The Dutch re-shaped the Spanish fort, reduced its size and renamed it .  

In 1661, Koxinga, a Ming China loyalist, with 400 warships and 25,000 men laid siege to the main Dutch fortress (Zeelandia in Anping). Defended by 2,000 Dutch soldiers, the Dutch left their fort in Keelung, when it became clear that no reinforcements were forthcoming from Zeelandia or Batavia (present day Jakarta, Indonesia).

In 1663, the Dutch returned to Keelung, retook the fort, strengthened and enlarged it and kept it until 1668, when they voluntarily gave it up, as the trade in Keelung was not what they expected it to be.

See also
 Port of Keelung
 Fort Provintia
 Cape of San Diego
 Eternal Golden Castle
 History of Taiwan
 Taiwan under Dutch rule
 Spanish Formosa

References

Bibliography

Dutch Formosa
Spanish Formosa
Historic sites in Taiwan
Military history of Taiwan
1620s in Taiwan
1626 establishments in the Spanish East Indies
17th century in Taiwan
Spanish East Indies